John Sullivan (5 February 1945 – 22 February 2006) was an English cricketer. He played for Lancashire between 1963 and 1976.

References

External links

1945 births
2006 deaths
English cricketers
Lancashire cricketers
People from Stalybridge